Hatchie Coon is an unincorporated community in Poinsett County, Arkansas, United States. It was also known as Coon Station.

References

Unincorporated communities in Poinsett County, Arkansas
Unincorporated communities in Arkansas
Arkansas placenames of Native American origin